Caliper Corporation was founded in 1983 as a developer of mapping software and is headquartered in Newton, Massachusetts.

Caliper develops geographic information systems (GIS) and transportation software. Caliper is also a consulting and R&D provider offering professional services in quantitative management consulting, transportation, and decision support systems development.

Caliper is the developer of the TransCAD transportation planning software, TransModeler traffic simulation software, and Maptitude GIS packages.

TransCAD
TransCAD is software for transportation planning. In addition to the standard point, line, area, and image layers in a GIS map, TransCAD supports route system layers and has tools for creating, manipulating and displaying routes. TransCAD uses a network data structure to support routing and network optimization models. TransCAD includes trip generation, distribution, mode choice, and traffic assignment models that support transportation planning and travel demand forecasting. TransCAD has a set of dynamic segmentation and linear referencing tools for managing highway, rail, pipeline, and other networks.

Product history
TransCAD was first released as a MS-DOS-based transportation GIS package in 1985. TransCAD 3.0, the first Microsoft Windows version, was released on May 28, 1996. TransCAD 4.8 was replaced by TransCAD 5.0 on January 2, 2008, and later TransCAD 6.0 and TransCAD 7.0. The most current version is TransCAD 8.0.

Web-based version
TransCAD for the Web is a web-based version of TransCAD that uses application source code that can be edited using Javascript, HTML, and ASP.NET. Application templates (Mapplications) are used to create a web application or service. The default templates include Ajax applications and mashups that use Google Maps via the Google Map API. TransCAD for the Web was the first web-based GIS for Transportation (GIS-T), and remains the only transportation GIS with web development capabilities.

Maptitude
By 2001, Caliper's new software mapping technology was being used by over fifty percent of the United States's legislatures to draft new electoral district boundaries following the 1999 census. By 2016, Maptitude was "fully loaded with just about every census information, with economic information, with every precinct-by-precinct results of elections all the way down ballot going back for years."

References

External links
 Official Mapping Software Website

GIS software companies
GIS software
Software companies based in Massachusetts
Traffic simulation
Software companies of the United States
Companies based in Massachusetts
1983 establishments in Massachusetts